Wang Ruixue (born 4 May 1987) is a Chinese retired goalball player. She won a silver medal at both the 2008 Summer Paralympics and the 2012 Summer Paralympics.

Wang has congenital albinism. Like her national teammates Lin Shan, Fan Feifei, and Ju Zhen, she started playing the sport under coach Wang Jinqin at the Weifang School of the Blind in Weifang, Shandong province. Since 2012, she has been teaching at the school.

References

Female goalball players
1987 births
Living people
Sportspeople from Shandong
People from Weifang
Paralympic goalball players of China
Paralympic silver medalists for China
Goalball players at the 2008 Summer Paralympics
Goalball players at the 2012 Summer Paralympics
Medalists at the 2008 Summer Paralympics
Medalists at the 2012 Summer Paralympics
Paralympic medalists in goalball
People with albinism
21st-century Chinese women